KLCW-TV (channel 22) is a television station licensed to Wolfforth, Texas, United States, serving the Lubbock area as an affiliate of The CW Plus. It is owned by Gray Television alongside NBC affiliate KCBD (channel 11) and four low-power stations—MyNetworkTV affiliate KMYL-LD (channel 14), Snyder-licensed Heroes & Icons affiliate KABI-LD (channel 42), Class A Telemundo affiliate KXTQ-CD (channel 46) and MeTV affiliate KLBB-LD (channel 48). Gray also provides certain services to Fox affiliate KJTV-TV (channel 34) and low-power Class A independent KJTV-CD (channel 32) under a shared services agreement (SSA) with SagamoreHill Broadcasting. The stations share studios at 98th Street and University Avenue in south Lubbock, where KLCW-TV's transmitter is also located.

History
Prior to 2006, what was then called KWBZ operated solely as a local cable TV station and was owned and operated by KCBD-TV, the local NBC affiliate. At that time, channel 22 was occupied by KUPT, an affiliate of UPN. On January 1, 2006, after the station was acquired by Ramar Communications, KUPT moved to channel 14 in Lubbock (now MyNetworkTV affiliate KMYL-LD), and the WB affiliation moved to channel 22.

KWBZ became a full power broadcast affiliate of The WB (via The WB 100+ Station Group as on cable) on January 1, 2006. Twenty-four days later, Warner Bros. Television, which owned The WB, and CBS Corporation, owner of UPN (channel 22's former network as KUPT), announced a merger of those two networks to take effect on September 18, 2006; the new network operating under the name of "The CW". KWBZ signed on to become a CW affiliate, resulting in new call letters (KLCW was adopted on June 30, 2006) and a rebranding (Lubbock CW). The station's feed is still affiliated with The CW Plus with local inserts and advertising placed by KJTV-TV and Ramar.

On October 19, 2020, Ramar announced that it would sell KLCW (and its accompanied low-power stations) to Gray Television (owner of KCBD) for $10 million. Concurrently, SagamoreHill Broadcasting would acquire sister station KJTV for $5 million. Gray would provide services to KJTV through a shared services agreement. The sale was completed on December 31.

Technical information

Subchannels
The station's digital signal is multiplexed:

Analog-to-digital conversion
Because it was granted an original construction permit after the FCC finalized the DTV allotment plan on April 21, 1997. The station did not receive a companion channel for a digital television station. Instead, on or before February 17, 2009, which was supposed to be the end of the digital TV conversion period for full-service stations, KLCW-TV would be required to turn off its analog signal and turn on its digital signal (called a "flash-cut").  As of September 2008, the station's digital signal began broadcasting on its pre-transition UHF channel 43. Through the use of PSIP, digital television receivers display the station's virtual channel as its former UHF analog channel 22.

See also
 KJTV-TV
 KUPT

References

External links
www.LubbockCW.com

Gray Television
The CW affiliates
True Crime Network affiliates
Television channels and stations established in 2001
Television stations in Lubbock, Texas
2001 establishments in Texas
Quest (American TV network) affiliates